Kuni-kyō (恭仁京, or Kuni no miyako), was the capital city of Japan between 740 and 744, whose imperial palace (恭仁宮 Kuni-kyū or Kuni no miya) was built in the present-day city of Kizugawa in Kyoto Prefecture by the order of Emperor Shōmu.

History
In 745 Emperor Shōmu moved the capital yet again to Naniwa-kyō (Osaka), and before the year was out, reverted the capital back to Heijō-kyō in Nara.

The Kuni area was a power base for Tachibana no Moroe, who was then the minister with de facto power over the cabinet, known as the "dajō-kan" or "Great Council". The later preference of Shigaraki as the capital possibly points to the rival Fujiwara clan mounting a comeback, since their influence extended around the Shigaraki area in Ōmi Province. The subsequent move to Naniwa may have been a compromise.

Emperor Shōmu moved the capital yet again Naniwa-kyō (Osaka) in 745, which may have been a spot the two factions could compromise on, but that same year reverted the capital back to Heijō-kyō in Nara.

Archaeological finds
Excavations so far (as of 2006) have revealed key buildings, laid out following the Chinese pattern, as the Daigokuden (大極殿) and Dairi (内裏). The area of palace is estimated to have been 560 meters wide east to west and 750 meters long, north to south.

See also
 Shoku Nihongi

References 

Former capitals of Japan
Nara period
History of Kyoto Prefecture
Planned capitals
Historic Sites of Japan
Emperor Shōmu